Katana Divisional Secretariat is a  Divisional Secretariat  of Gampaha District, of Western Province, Sri Lanka. Andiambalama, Kimbulapitiya, and Kowinna are notable municipalities within this divisional secretariat.

References
 Divisional Secretariats Portal

Divisional Secretariats of Gampaha District